King Django (born Jeffrey Baker) is an American bandleader, singer, songwriter, arranger, engineer, producer, and multi-instrumentalist, especially in the genres of ska, rocksteady, reggae, dub, dancehall, rhythm & blues and soul.  Other influences in his music have included traditional jazz, swing, klezmer, hardcore/punk rock, hip-hop and electronica.

Django has toured many times throughout the US, Europe, Canada, and Japan as the leader of Stubborn All-Stars, Skinnerbox, and the King Django Band and as a sideman with such renowned acts as Rancid, Murphy's Law, The Slackers, and The Toasters.  He is also widely known and respected as an influential mentor to younger musicians, sharing and spreading his deep knowledge of and love for Jamaican and American music.  Django currently performs regularly leading the King Django Band and Bad Luck Dice and as a sideman with Predator Dub Assassins.

Early years
King Django was born at Brookdale Hospital in Brooklyn, NY and grew up in the east Brooklyn neighborhood of Canarsie.  His interest in music was sparked while attending Hunter College High School in uptown Manhattan, New York. At age 15 he became a professional computer programmer in New York. Since taking up the trombone at age 19, the self-taught musician has been steadily playing, touring, and recording with a series of bands. From 1986 to 1988, he played trombone, wrote, composed, sang and co-lead the seminal NYC Rocksteady band The Boilers. In late 1988 Django formed Skinnerbox, melding ska, reggae, dancehall, funk, punk, jump blues, soul and psychedelia.

Baker is Jewish, and his grandfather survived the Holocaust.

Stubborn Records
In 1992 he formed the Stubborn Records label to release Skinnerbox's debut full-length CD Tales of the Red. The Stubborn Records label went on to define the 1990s New York Traditional Ska sound and continues releasing new material to this day.

Stubborn All-Stars
In 1994 he assembled a group of musicians under the name Stubborn All-Stars for a recording session which yielded the 4-song vinyl EP “Old's Cool” released on the Stubborn Records.  Within two weeks of the release of this record, he was summoned to the offices of Profile Records in NYC to sign a recording contract. In 1995 and 1996 Stubborn All-Stars had a degree of commercial success with the singles “Tin Spam” and “Pick Yourself Up,” which saw rotation on MTV.

Version City
In 1997 Django assembled the Version City recording studio which rapidly became the hub of the NYC ska and reggae scene. The popular Version City Party was started that same year at Coney Island High on St. Mark's Place in Manhattan's East Village. In 2000 the studio was moved to New Brunswick, NJ where Django continues his engineering and production work for a wide roster of international clients. 
In August 2006 after several years of floating to different venues, most notably SEHO in the Lower East Side, the Version City Party was resurrected as a monthly at the Knitting Factory in New York City, on the first Saturday of every month.

Echo Mix Wave Tour
In late 2011, Django was a headlining performer on the month-long “Echo Mix” tour along with Konrad Kuechenmeister (Berlin, Germany) and Brian Hill of Regatta 69.  In June of the same year, Django set out alone for Florida, performing a string of shows with several different backing bands. In 2012 Django celebrated the 20th anniversary of his independent label Stubborn Records, as well as the 5th anniversary of his Version City label based in Kingston, Jamaica.

Version City Tour
In late 2012/early 2013, Django took his popular, long-standing NYC Rocksteady and Ska “Version City” Party (active since 1997, most notably at prestigious NYC venue The Knitting Factory) on the road, leading the first Version City Tour through 30 dates in 10 states.  Playing piano and trombone, supported by young PA band The Snails, Django performed a wide selection of his own material as well as a number of classic reggae and ska tunes.

In February 2013, Django was invited to perform in Kingston, Jamaica, at the Institute of Jamaica’s Jamaica Music Museum, accompanying such musical dignitaries as Mystic Revelation of Rastafari, Ras Michael, Nambo Robinson, Big Youth, Junior Reid, and Bongo Herman.

In late May/early June 2013, Django led the second outing of his Version City Tour through 27 east coast shows in 25 days.  Version City Tour #2 featured a compact and versatile quartet with Django being joined by Brian Hill of NC’s Regatta 69 on bass and vocals as well as guitarist/vocalist John DeCarlo of hard-touring Boston ska group Westbound Train.  Depending o the venue the show ranged from 45 minutes to three hours, showcasing the songs of these three veteran performers, along with drummer Anthony Vito Fraccalvieri of Long Island bands Broadcaster and Royal City Riot (who had just come off a six-week US tour with The Toasters).

Discography

with Skinnerbox
Instrumental Conditioning cassette 1990
Now & Then cassette 1992
Tales of the Red CD/cassette (Stubborn), May 1993
"Does He Love You"/"Right Side" 7" single (Stubborn) Dec. 1993
Sunken Treasure 4-song EP (Stubborn) July 1994
Special Wild 1989-1994 CD (Stubborn), May 1996
What You Can Do, What You Can't (Moon Ska) Apr 1997
Demonstration full-length CD/CS (Triple Crown Records/Stubborn) Dec 1998

Compilation appearances
NYC SKA Live LP (Moon) 1991
Step on a Crack (Sound Views) 1992
Skarmageddon CD (Moon) July 1994
Stay Sharp Vol. 2 (Step-1 - England) June 1995
Skinnerbox, Scofflaws V/A: Joint Ventures of Ska CD (DVS Media) May 1996
Skinnerbox, Dunia & Django, The Stable Boys, Noah & The Arks, et al. V/A: Roots, Branch & Stem CD *(Stubborn), June 1996
This Aren't 2-Tone compilation CD (Too Hep) 1996
Big Skank Theory (1997, Le Silence De La Rue - France)
Skankaholics Anonymous (Moon Ska) Apr 1997
Skinnerbox, Stubborn All-Stars V/A: Give 'Em the Boot (1997, Hellcat)
Track 08 - "Does He Love You?"
Skinnerbox, The Lonely Boys V/A: Who's The Man (Full Stop) 1998
All Around Massive (Cole Mack) 1998
Ska, Punk & Disorderly (BANKSHOT!) 1998
NYC Ska Mob & Friends (Grover - Germany) Dec 1998

with Stubborn All-Stars
Old's Cool EP (1994, Stubborn)
Open Season CD/LP (1995, Another Planet Records 6009)
Back With a New Batch (November 1997, Triple Crown Records 3003)
Nex Music (1999, Stubborn)
Compilation appearances
Spawn of Skarmageddon (1995, Moon Ska Records 058)
Track 01 - "Tired of Struggling"
Ed's Next Move soundtrack CD/CS (1996, Milan Records 35776)
Track 04 - "Look Away"
Rancid with Stubborn All-Stars: Beavis & Butthead Do America soundtrack (1996, Geffen)
Track 05 - "I Wanna Riot"
New York Beat: Breaking and Entering CD (1997, Moon Ska Records 099)
Track 20 - "Bald Man Jump"
Dancin' Mood CD/LP (1997, Triple Crown Records 3002/Another Planet Records 6019)
Track 03 - "Dave Helm" / Track 07 - "Citadel"
Give 'Em the Boot CD (1997, Hellcat Records 80402/Epitaph Records 04022)
Track 10 - "Open Season"
Roots, Branch and Stem: Living Tradition in Ska! CD (1998, Stubborn Records 002)
Track 02 - "Tin Spam (Bokkle mix)"
Somewhere in the City soundtrack CD (1998, Velvel Records 79717)
Track 11 - "Tim Spam"
City Rockers: A Tribute To The Clash CD (1999, Chord Records 030)
Track 11 - "Lose This Skin"
NYC Ska Mob & Friends (December 1998, Grover Records - Germany)

Other recordings
King Django: Brooklyn Hangover (2010, Stubborn Records)
 Subatomic Sound System: On All Frequencies (featuring King Django)(Subatomic Sound/ Modus Vivendi / Nomadic Wax) 2007
King Django: Roots Tonic (Jump Up/Stubborn/Big 8) 2005/2006
 Subatomic Sound System: Lost Hits Vol. 1: Dancehall versus Hip Hop (dancehall remixes with King Django) (Subatomic Sound) 2005
King Django: A Single Thread (Megalith/Leech) 2004
V/A: Version City Sessions (Asian Man) 2004
Sonic Boom Six Through the Eyes of a Child (Rebel Alliance Recordings) 2009
Version City Rockers: Deeper Roots (Antifaz) 2004
King Django meets the Scrucialists (2003, Leech/Grover)
Don Khumalo: De Vuelta al Ska (2001, Stubborn Venezuela)
King Django: Reason (2001, Hellcat/Epitaph)
Version City Rockers: Version City Dub Clash (2000, Stubborn/Jump Start)
Radiation Kings Early Years (1999, Stubborn)
King Django King Django’s Roots & Culture (1998, Triple Crown)
The Agents For All The Massive (Radical) Oct 1998
Rocker T & Version City Rockers Nicer By The Hour (June 1998, Stubborn/December 1998, Grover Records - Germany)
Rocket From the Crypt
The Usuals At Shirley & Juicy’s (1997, No Idea)
The Toasters Hard Band for Dead (1996, Moon)
The Slackers Better Late Than Never (1996, Moon Ska)
CIV Set Your Goals (1995, Revelation Records/Atlantic)
Die Monster Die 1995
Murphy's Law Good For Now EP (1993, We Bite Records)
Outface Outface (1993, Crisis/Revelation)
The Boilers Rockin' Steady LP (Oi/Ska - England) 1988
Compilation appearances
Too True: NY Beat - Hit & Run (1985, Moon)
The Boilers: Skaface LP (1988, Moon)
Django and Elwood: Keep the Pressure On (1996, Kingpin Records)
Castillo y La Rabia: Latin Ska Vol. 2 (Moon) 1996
King Django, The Demanders, Selika and Django: Version City (Stubborn) Dec 1997
King Django: Give 'Em the Boot III (2002, Hellcat/Epitaph)
Track 17 - "Precipice"
Version City Rockers: Roots of Dub Funk 3 (Tanty Records) 2003

References

External links
King Django website

Year of birth missing (living people)
Living people
American male singers
American ska trombonists
Male trombonists
Hellcat Records artists
Third-wave ska groups
Triple Crown Records artists
21st-century American Jews
21st-century trombonists
21st-century American male musicians
The Slackers members